The Wild North is a 1960 book by Ion Idriess. It is a collection of 24 short stories and sketches about Cape York, some of which were written early in Idriess' career.

References

External links
The Wild North at AustLit

1960 short story collections
Australian short story collections
Queensland in fiction
Far North Queensland
Books by Ion Idriess
Angus & Robertson books